Pulgasari is a 1985 North Korean horror-action kaiju film directed by Shin Sang-ok. It stars Chang Son Hui and Pak Sung Ho and features special effects by Duk Ho Kim, supervised by Teruyoshi Nakano. The film centers around the legend of the Bulgasari and is based on the lost 1962 film from South Korea of the same name.

Director Shin had been kidnapped in 1978 by North Korean intelligence on the orders of Kim Jong-il, son of the then-ruling Kim Il-sung and was coerced into making several films as a director, with Pulgasari being his final before he and his wife, actress Choi Eun-hee, escaped to the United States.

Plot 
In feudal Korea, during the Goryeo Dynasty, a king controls the land with an iron fist, subjecting the peasantry to misery and starvation. An old blacksmith who was sent to prison for defending his people creates a tiny figurine of a monster by making a doll of rice and before dying asks the gods of earth and sky to make his creation a living creature that protects the rebels and the oppressed. When the figurine comes into contact with the blood of the blacksmith's daughter, the creature springs to life, becoming a giant metal-eating monster whom the blacksmith's daughter names Pulgasari, which is the name of the mythical monster her father used to mention as an eater of iron and steel. Pulgasari now shares a special bond with the blacksmith's daughter, and after he starts eating some of the farmer's tools, becomes a giant and powerful figure.

After much suffering, the peasants form an army, storm the palace of the region's Governor and kill him. Soon after the evil king becomes aware that there is a rebellion being planned in the country and he intends to crush it, but he runs into Pulgasari, who fights with the peasant army to overthrow the corrupt monarchy. Pulgasari wins many battles because of his unending hunger for all kind of metal, readily provided by its enemies. Nevertheless, after capturing and executing the leader of the rebellion (who was also the future husband of the blacksmith's daughter), the king's army threatens to kill the blacksmith's daughter if Pulgasari does not surrender. Pulgasari lets itself be trapped to save the woman, and the royal army apparently kills the creature by burying it under the ground. After escaping, the blacksmith's daughter revives Pulgasari by again pouring some of her blood on the burial site. Pulgasari grows strong once more and attacks the king's palace, destroying it and simultaneously killing the king.

After the defeat of the king, Pulgasari becomes a new problem, since he starts eating the rebel's weapons and farmer's tools, which are given to the creature without objection, since the peasants still believe Pulgasari is a benign savior. The blacksmith's daughter realizes that Pulgasari's hunger will never stop, and that he is inadvertently oppressing the people he fought for. She decides to sacrifice herself by hiding inside a big bell that Pulgasari finds and quickly eats. Pulgasari yells in anguish as the blacksmith's daughter's presence in its system causes it to turn to stone and crumble into pieces, tragically killing both of them, but saving the people once and for all.

Cast
 Chang Son Hui as Ami
 Ham Gi Sop as Inde
 Jong-uk Ri as Ana
 Gwon Ri as Takse
 Gyong-ae Yu as Inde's Mother
 Hye-chol Ro as Inde's Brother
 Sang-hun Tae as Rebel Forces
 Gi-chon Kim as Rebel Forces
 In-chol Ri as Rebel Forces
 Riyonun Ri as General Fuan
 Yong-hok Pak as The King
 Pong-ilk Pak as The Governor
 Kenpachiro Satsuma as Pulgasari
 "Little Man Machan" as Baby Pulgasari

Background 
The film is based around a legendary creature called the "Pulgasari" (or "Bulgasari"). The original story was set in the city of Songdo (now Kaesong, North Korea).

Production
The film was a loose remake of a lost 1962 film directed by Kim Myeong-je, which is believed to be the first Korean kaiju film, predating Yongary, Monster from the Deep and Space Monster, Wangmagwi by five years. Kim Jong-il was a lifelong admirer of the director, as well as Godzilla and other kaiju films. He kidnapped the former director Shin Sang-ok and his wife, famous actress Choi Eun-hee, with the specific purpose of making fantasy/propaganda films for the North Korean government. Kim also produced Pulgasari (through Korean Film Studio) and all the films that Shin made before he and Choi managed to escape from their minders while on a festival tour in Austria. Specifically, the film was inspired by The Return of Godzilla. The staff from Japan's Toho Studios, the creators of Godzilla, participated in creating the film's special effects. They were tricked into coming as they thought they were filming in China.

Jonathan Ross stated that the film was intended by the North Korean government to be a propaganda metaphor for the effects of unchecked capitalism and the power of the collective.

Legacy 
Kenpachiro Satsuma was quoted as saying he preferred Pulgasari to TriStar's Godzilla. There has been some speculation that the director Shin Sang-ok included a hidden message of his own in the film; the monster of the movie was to be interpreted as both a metaphor for Kim Il-sung betraying a people's revolution for his own purposes and as a plea to the North Korean people to rise up against the Kim regime, represented by Pulgasari demanding his subjects fed him more and more iron farming equipment even after the former regime has been defeated, leading to the workers turning against and ultimately defeating their former savior.

After finding out that his credit was removed from the movie, Shin Sang-ok wrote a remake called The Adventures of Galgameth in 1996. Pulgasari became the first North Korean film to be released in South Korean theaters in 2000. Ten years later in 2006, Pulgasari made its New York debut at the end of Columbia University Japanese culture center's year-long "Godzilla festival."

Shin Sang-ok and Choi Eun-hee's story 

Pulgasari has gained some popularity over the years because of the shocking story of Shin Sang-ok and Choi Eun-hee's kidnapping at the hands of North Korea's government. During their strange captivity in the country, Shin and Choi were, respectively, director and leading actress in a number of North Korean films produced by Kim Jong-il. The director and leading actress made together a total of seven films, for which the couple – who were separated before their kidnapping – was simultaneously commissioned and forced to do by North Korea's government.  Pulgasari was made in 1985, the same year that Shin's North Korean films Salt and The Tale of Shim Chong were released. It was the last film directed by Shin before he and Choi escaped to the United States.

See also 

 Abduction of Shin Sang-ok and Choi Eun-hee
 Culture of North Korea
 List of North Korean films
 Propaganda in North Korea

References

External links 
 
 N. Korean movies' propaganda role BBC
 Goo Movies 

1985 films
Fictional golems
Films directed by Shin Sang-ok
1980s Korean-language films
North Korean fantasy films
North Korean horror films
1980s monster movies
Giant monster films
1985 fantasy films
Dark fantasy films
Epic fantasy films
1980s supernatural horror films
Kim Jong-il
Kaiju films
Films set in Korea
ADV Films
Films set in the Goryeo Dynasty
1980s Japanese films